A quasi-Hopf algebra is a generalization of a Hopf algebra, which was defined by the Russian mathematician Vladimir Drinfeld in 1989.

A quasi-Hopf algebra is a quasi-bialgebra  for which there exist  and a bijective antihomomorphism S (antipode) of  such that

 
 

for all  and where 

and

and

As for a quasi-bialgebra, the property of being quasi-Hopf is preserved under twisting.

Usage 

Quasi-Hopf algebras form the basis of the study of Drinfeld twists and the representations in terms of F-matrices associated with finite-dimensional irreducible representations of quantum affine algebra. F-matrices can be used to factorize the corresponding R-matrix. This leads to applications in Statistical mechanics, as quantum affine algebras, and their representations give rise to solutions of the Yang–Baxter equation, a solvability condition for various statistical models, allowing characteristics of the model to be deduced from its corresponding quantum affine algebra. The study of F-matrices has been applied to models such as the Heisenberg XXZ model in the framework of the algebraic Bethe ansatz. It provides a framework for solving two-dimensional integrable models by using the quantum inverse scattering method.

See also
 Quasitriangular Hopf algebra
 Quasi-triangular quasi-Hopf algebra
 Ribbon Hopf algebra

References 
 Vladimir Drinfeld, "Quasi-Hopf algebras", Leningrad Math J. 1 (1989), 1419-1457
 J. M. Maillet and J. Sanchez de Santos, Drinfeld Twists and Algebraic Bethe Ansatz, Amer. Math. Soc. Transl. (2) Vol. 201, 2000

Coalgebras